"Blue to the Bone" is a song written by Michael Garvin and Bucky Jones, and recorded by American country music duo Sweethearts of the Rodeo.  It was released in August 1988 as the second single from the album One Time, One Night.  The song reached #5 on the Billboard Hot Country Singles & Tracks chart.

Charts

Weekly charts

Year-end charts

References

1988 singles
1988 songs
Sweethearts of the Rodeo songs
Song recordings produced by Steve Buckingham (record producer)
Columbia Records singles
Songs written by Michael Garvin
Songs written by Bucky Jones